Journey to the End of the Night is the 13th studio album by The Mekons. It was released on audio CD on 7 March 2000 by Quarterstick Records. The album was recorded in London at the MontiSound & Corina Studios and also in Chicago at the Stinkpole & Kingsize Sound Labs, it was then finally mixed and mastered by Kenny Sluiter in Kingside.

Track listing
 "Myth"  – 3:52
 "Out in the Night"  – 3:31
 "Last Week of the War"  – 2:59
 "City of London"  – 4:02
 "Tina"  – 3:56
 "The Flood"  – 4:51                            
 "Cast No Shadow"  – 3:03
 "Ordinary Night"  – 3:19
 "Power and Horror"  – 2:42
 "Neglect"  – 4:02
 "Something To Be Scared Of"  – 2:38
 "Last Night of Earth"  – 3:42
 "... And Heracles Smiled" – 0:42

Personnel 

 Steve Goulding – drums
 Susie Honeyman – fiddle
 Sarah Corina – bass, vocals
 Sally Timms – vocals
 Tom Greenhalgh – vocals, guitar, autoharp, piano
 Jon Langford – vocals, guitar, melodica, machines
 Rico Bell – vocals, accordion, harmonica
 Lu Edmonds – cumbus

Guest Appearances:

 Edith Frost, Kelly Hogan, Neko Case – backing vocals
 John Rice – electric sitar on "Cast No Shadows"
 Mitch Marlow – rhythm guitar on "Last Night on Earth"

References

2007 albums
Quarterstick Records albums
The Mekons albums